Joseph Deharbe (11 April 1800 at Strasbourg, Alsace – 8 November 1871 at Maria-Laach) was a French Jesuit theologian and catechist.

Life
He entered the Society of Jesus in 1817 and after teaching for eleven years at the Jesuit College at Brieg, Switzerland, he became in 1840 a missionary and catechist in Köthen, Germany. With Father Rohe, S.J., he established at Lucerne in 1845 the academy of St. Charles Borromeo. In 1847 he left Switzerland, which had become hostile to Jesuits.

After that he was chiefly engaged in giving missions in Germany.

Works
As a catechist in Köthen he felt the lack of a good catechism, and was encouraged by his superior, Fr. Devis, to compose one. As a model he took the Mainz catechism of 1842 and made use also of other good textbooks, notably of Bossuet's catechism. He completed his first catechism, called "Katholischer Katechismus oder Lehrbegriff" in 1847.

In 1848 it appeared anonymously at Ratisbon and immediately won approval. Bishop Blum of Linsburg introduced it officially into his diocese the same year; the following year the bishops of Trier and Hildesheim did likewise for their dioceses. In 1850 the Bavarian bishops resolved to introduce a common catechism for the entire kingdom, and accepted Deharbe's catechism, which was then introduced in 1853. Other German dioceses adopted it as follows: Cologne, 1854; Mainz and Paderborn, 1855; Fulda, 1858; Ermland, 1861; Culm, 1863; Gnesen-Posen, 1868. At the same time it spread outside of Germany, in Switzerland, Austria-Hungary, and the United States. It was translated in 1851 into Magyar, then into Bohemian, Italian, and French; into Swedish and Marathi, 1861; into Polish and Lithuanian, 1862; into Slovenian, 1868; into Danish, 1869; and later into Spanish and Portuguese. It was reintroduced into Bavaria in 1908. In a revised form, Austria adopted it in 1897.

Deharbe himself prepared and published at Ratisbon four extracts of his first work, titled

 "Katholischer Katechismus" (1847); (In English: A Complete Catechism of the Catholic Religion)
 "Kleiner katholischer Katechismus" (1847);
 "Anfangsgründe der katholichen Lehre für die kleinen Schüler" (1847);
 "Kleiner katholischer Katechismus" (1849–50).

He preserved catechetical tradition but abandoned the division of Peter Canisius, arranging the text-matter under chapters on Faith, Commandments, and Means of Grace.

His other works, all published at Ratisbon, are: 
"Die vollkommene Liebe Gottes" (1855);
"Erklärung des katholischen Katechismus (4 vols., 1857-64, fifth ed., (1880-);
"Kürzeres Handbuch zum Religionsunterrichte" (1865–68, sixth ed., Linden ed., 1898).

References

Attribution
 The entry cites:
Spirago-Mesmer, Method of Christian Doctrine (Cincinnati, 1901);
Linden, Der mittlere Deharbesche Katischismus (Ratisbon, 1900);
Thalhoffer, Entwicklung des katholischen Katechismus in Deutschland (Freiburg, 1899);
Hermann Rolfus and Adolf Pfister, Realencyclopädie des Erziehungs und Unterrichtswesens (Mainz, 1874), passim;
Krieg, Katechtik (Freiburg, 1907);
Herder, Konversationslexicon, s. v.;
Baier, Methodik (Würzburg, 1897).

External links
 

1800 births
1871 deaths
19th-century German Jesuits
19th-century German Catholic theologians
19th-century German male writers
19th-century German writers
Jesuit theologians
German male non-fiction writers